William and Ann was built at a King's Yard (naval dockyard) in 1759, under another name. From 1786 until 1791 she was a whaler in the northern whale fishery. In 1791 she transported convicts to New South Wales and then began whale hunting around New Zealand; she returned to England in 1793. Circa 1801 she again became a whaler in the northern whale fishery, sailing from Leith. She continued whaling until 1839. She then began trading widely, to Bahia, Bombay, Archangel, Spain, Honduras, and the Mediterranean. She was last listed in 1857, having been in service for over 90 years.

Career
She was lengthened and raised in 1767, becoming 370 tons; a new upper part and thorough repairs were undertaken in 1785. She first appeared in Lloyd's Register (LR) as William and Ann in 1786. Her immediate previous name was Ipswich. Missing volumes of LR and missing pages in extant volumes of LR have so far made it impossible to trace her back through name changes to her origins in the Royal Navy. Repairs to fix previous repair work were undertaken in 1789. Further repairs were undertaken in 1791, when she was sheathed and doubled. 

Under the command of Master Eber Bunker, she departed Plymouth as part of the third fleet on 27 March 1791, and arrived on 28 August 1791 in Port Jackson, New South Wales. She embarked 188 male convicts, of whom seven died during the voyage. 

Captain Bunker then conducted the first recorded visit by a whaling ship to New Zealand, calling in at Doubtless Bay in 1791 while hunting sperm whales in the South Pacific. She was reported off the coast of Peru in 1792. She returned to Sydney and thence sailed to England. She was reported off the coast of Brazil in March 1793. She returned to England on 20 May 1793 with 68 tuns of sperm oil and 8468 seal skins.

In April 1802 William and Ann, Kelly, master, sailed from Leith for Davis Strait, but had to put back into Stromness, leaky.

The data below for the period between 1814 and 1839 comes primarily from Coltish, though amended or corrected with reports in the contemporary press.

In 1836 the whaler  became beset in ice and overwintered in Davis Strait, drifting with the ice. 
William and Ann was the first whaler to sight Swan, on 14 May. Swan was then some 30 miles west of Disco and Captain Stairton's men refused to got to Swans assistance on the grounds that Swan was far off and they weren't paid to do so. She was only able to get free because the crews of five whalers came upon her and sawed 3000 feet of heavy ice to get her out. (One of the five may have been William and Ann.)

Citations and references

Citations

References
 
 
 

William and Ann

1759 ships
Ships of the Third Fleet
Age of Sail merchant ships
Merchant ships of the United Kingdom